Losar Baoli (the Losar Stepwell) is a stepwell in the Margalla Hills of the Islamabad Capital Territory, Pakistan. Near the town of Shah Allah Ditta in the Potohar Plateau, the area was a passageway for caravans and armies moving along the east–west direction.

History
The Losar Baoli, near the village Losar Sharfu Tehsil Taxila, is thought to have been constructed by the Emperor Sher Shah Suri to facilitate the caravans moving towards Kabul via Taxila.

References

External links
 Step well from Mughal period

Archaeological sites in Pakistan
Islamabad